The following is a list of important sites of interest in and around the city of Lima, Peru.

Beaches and waterfront

Ancón
Asia
Chancay
Pucusana
Miraflores
Los Pavos
Playa Punta Roquitas
Playa Waikiki
Playa Makaha
Playa Barranquito
Playa Redondo
Playa La Estrella
Playa Arica
Playa El Silencio
Playa La Herradura
Playa La Pampilla
Playa Agua Dulce
Playa Punta Hermosa
Playa Santa María
Cerro Azul
Costa Verde Highway (Green Coast Avenue)

Museums

National Museum of the Archaeology, Anthropology, and History of Peru (Museo Nacional del Arqueología, Antropología, e Historia del Perú)
National Museum of Perú - MUNA
Museum of the Nation (Museo de la Nación)
Gold Museum of Peru and Weapons of the World
Arts & Peruvian Popular Traditions Museum
Japanese Immigration Museum
Larco Museum (Museo Larco)
Lima Art Museum (Museo de Arte de Lima; MALI)
Walls of Lima Walls and Museum
Metropolitan Museum, Lima (Museo Metropolitano)
Miguel Grau House-Museum
Morro de Arica soldiers Museum
Mario Testino Museum, MATE
 Museo de los Descalzos (Museum of The Barefoot)
 Museo Pedro de Osma
Museum of Italian Art
Museum of Natural History, Lima (Museo de Historia Natural)
Presbítero Maestro cemetery
Ricardo Palma House-Museum
Museum of the Inquisition Museo de la Inquisicion
Real Felipe Fortress
 Nicolini Auto Museum, La Molina (Museo de Autos Nicolini)

Full List of Museums of Lima:
Museos de Lima

Shopping centres
Plaza Norte, Independencia (The biggest)
Real Plaza Puruchuco, Ate
Plaza San Miguel, San Miguel (The oldest)
Jockey Plaza, Santiago de Surco (The most visited and 2nd biggest)
Larcomar, Miraflores
Camino Real Mall, San Isidro
Risso Mall, Lince
Mega Plaza Norte, Independencia
El Polo, Santiago de Surco
Royal Plaza, Independencia
Open Plaza Angamos, Surquillo
Open Plaza Atocongo, San Juan de Miraflores
Mall del Sur, San Juan de Miraflores
Open Plaza La Marina, San Miguel
Plaza Lima Sur, Chorrillos
Primavera Park Plaza, San Borja
Real Plaza Centro Civico, Lima
Real Plaza Salaverry, Jesús María
Real Plaza Santa Clara, Ate
Mall Aventura Plaza Santa Anita, Santa Anita
Mall Plaza Comas, Comas
Arenales Mall, Lince

Historical buildings

Historical centre of Lima
Government Palace (Peru)
Plaza Mayor of Lima
Lima Cathedral
Catacombs and Monastery of San Francisco, Lima
Congress of the Republic
Basilica and Convent of San Pedro
Basilica of Santo Domingo
Casona of the San Marcos University 
Desamparados Station
Italian Arts Museum
Lima's Art Center
Lima's Mayor House
National Culture Institute
Palace of Justice
Perez Aranibar Children House
Rimac Building
Riva Aguero House
Rosa Nautica Restaurant
Monastery of San Francisco
Sanctuary of Las Nazarenas
Sanctuary of Saint Rose of Lima
Segura Theater
Torre Tagle Palace
Plaza de toros de Acho
Plaza San Martin
University Park
Naval Heroes Park
Plaza Roberto F. Lund
Alameda Chabuca Granda
Lima's City Walls Park

Pre-Columbian Sites

 Pachacamac Temple
 Huaca Pucllana
 Huaca Huallamarca

Islands
San Lorenzo
El Frontón
Palomino
Pachacamac

Amusement parks
Park of the Exposition, Lima
Park of the Reserve (Largest Fountain Complex in the World), Lima
Lima's Monterrico Hippodrome, Santiago de Surco
Campo de Marte, Jesús María
Granja Villa, Chorrillos
Three Tires Pool, Puente Piedra
M&M Park - Kart Circuit, Magdalena del Mar
Park of the Friendship, Santiago de Surco
Reducto Nº2 Park, Miraflores
Reducto Nº5 Park, Surquillo
Huampani, Lurigancho
Alameda de los Descalzos, Rimac
Paseo de Aguas, Rimac
Kennedy Park, Miraflores
Love Park, Miraflores
Sports Center, Barranco
Sports Center, Santiago de Surco
Sports Center, VIDENA, San Luis
Sports Center, Miraflores
Pantanos de Villa, Chorrillos

Zoos
Centro Ecológico Recreacional de Huachipa, Ate
Parque de las Leyendas, San Miguel

Other places

Chinatown, Lima
Jirón de la Union
Larco Avenue
Bridge of Sighs, Puente de los Suspiros Barranco District
Grand National Theatre of Peru
Free Walking Tour of Lima

References

External links
 Larco Museum
  Guide of Peru Museums
  Congress and Inquisition Museum
  Plaza Norte (Shopping Mall)
  Parque de las Leyendas (Lima Zoo)
 Magic Water Circuit of the Reserve Park

Buildings and structures in Lima
Tourist attractions in Lima
Lima

Lima sites of interest
Lima Metropolitan area
Lima-related lists
Lima